Guild of Dungeoneering is a dungeon crawl role-playing video game developed by Gambrinous and published by Versus Evil.  The game was released for Microsoft Windows and OS X on July 14, 2015.

Gameplay

Guild of Dungeoneering is a dungeon crawl role-playing video game with turn-based combat and card game mechanics.

Release
Guild of Dungeoneering was released for Microsoft Windows and OS X on July 14, 2015.

Reception

Guild of Dungeoneering received average reviews from professional critics upon release.  Aggregate review website Metacritic assigned a score of 72/100. IGN awarded it a score of 7.0 out of 10, saying "Guild of Dungeoneering is a fun and interesting approach to turn-based dungeon crawlers."

References

External links
 

2015 video games
Dungeon crawler video games
MacOS games
Role-playing video games
Single-player video games
Windows games
Video games developed in Ireland
Fictional guilds
Versus Evil games